The Grand Duke's Finances is a 1924 silent German comedy film directed by F. W. Murnau.

Plot
The Grand Duke of Abacco is heir to a small and heavily indebted Mediterranean island. The Grand Duke is trying to hide from usurer Marcowitz who demands debt repayment. One hope to improve the situation would be a wedding with the Russian Grand Duchess Olga who sent him a letter saying she is determined to marry him despite not knowing him and against the opposition of her brother the Crown Prince of Russia. Businessman Bekker offers a substantial sum of money to exploit a sulphur mine but the Grand Duke is worried it would have negative effects on his subjects. Bekker joins with local conspirators to organise a revolution against the Grand Duke. In addition, the letter from Grand Duchess Olga is fraudulently obtained by Marcowitz.

Thief-detective Phillip Collin, passing as Professor Pelotard, accepts to retrieve from Markowitz incriminating letters written by Congressman Isaac. In the process, he also finds the letter from Grand Duchess Olga and replaces it with a fake. He asks Isaac for a 50,000 pound loan as his fee and tells him that he will use it to speculate on Abacco's debt. The Grand Duke decides to go secretly to the continent to retrieve Olga's letter.

Phillip Collin meets an unknown woman in a café, who asks him to help her hide from her pursuers. He willingly obliges and soon finds out that she is Grand Duchess Olga and that her pursuer is her brother.

The newspapers report on the speculation on Abacco's bonds, on the outbreak of a revolution in Abacco and on the disappearance of the Grand Duke. All regular voyages to Abacco are interrupted but Olga, who now passes as Collins' wife, manages to charter a ship to take her to Abacco island. She accepts to take along the Grand Duke, whom she has not recognised, and who introduced himself as a supporter of the Grand Duke. Marcowitz boards the Russian Crown Prince's warship and convinces him to go to Abacco by showing him his sister's (fake) letter.

In Abacco the Grand Duke and Collin overcome the self-proclaimed president and his accomplices after a short fight. However further revolutionaries overpower the Grand Duke and start preparing his hanging. Olga now understands who he is and wants to buy him off the revolutionaries, without success. At that moment, the Russian Crown Prince take control of the situation with his sailors. However, he is also inclined to have the Grand Duke hanged, for having sold his sister's letter. However Olga dismisses the letter as clumsy forgery. Collin gives back the authentic letter to the Grand Duke which allows him to refute the accusation. The Crown Prince orders an immediate marriage and Collin celebrates the success of his speculation on Abacco's debt.

Cast
In alphabetical order
 Alfred Abel as Philipp Collins
 Mady Christians as Großfürstin Olga von Rußland
 Adolphe Engers as Don Esteban Paqueno
 Julius Falkenstein as Ernst Isaacs
 Ilka Grüning as Augustine, die Köchin
 Guido Herzfeld as Markowitz, ein Wucherer
 Georg August Koch as Der gefährliche Verschwörer
 Harry Liedtke as Don Roman XX, Großherzog von Abacco
 Walter Rilla as Luis Hernandez
 Hans Hermann Schaufuss as Der bucklige Verschwörer
 Robert Scholtz as Bruder der Großfürstin
 Max Schreck as Der unheimliche Verschwörer
 Hermann Vallentin as Herr Binzer
 Balthasar von Campenhausen as Adjutant

Production and release
The film is based on the eponymous novel by Swedish author Frank Heller adapted by Thea von Harbou. It was shot from May to August 1923 at UFA's Tempelhof Studios in Berlin, on the sets built by Rochus Gliese and Erich Czerwonski. The on-location scenes were shot on the Adriatic coast in Split, Kotor, Zadar and Rab. The film premièred in Berlin on 7 January 1924 at the Ufa-Palast am Zoo. It is the only comedy directed by F. W. Murnau.

References

External links

1924 films
1924 comedy films
German comedy films
Films of the Weimar Republic
German silent feature films
Films directed by F. W. Murnau
Films with screenplays by Thea von Harbou
German black-and-white films
Films based on Swedish novels
Films set in Europe
Films set in the Mediterranean Sea
Films set on islands
Films produced by Erich Pommer
Films with screenplays by Fritz Wendhausen
UFA GmbH films
Films shot at Tempelhof Studios
Silent comedy films
1920s German films